Futbol Club Ascó is a Spanish football team based in Ascó, in the autonomous community of Catalonia. Founded in 2010 it plays in Tercera División RFEF – Group 5, holding home matches at Estadio Municipal, which has a capacity of 1,500 spectators.

History
Ascó was founded in 2010 as the result of a merger between CFJE Ascó EF and FC Benavent. It immediately started competing in Tercera División, the first national category, being relegated in that first year and returning in 2013.

Season to season

8 seasons in Tercera División
1 season in Tercera División RFEF

Notable coaches
 Mauro Ravnić
 Miguel Ángel Rubio
 Josep Ferré

References

External links
Official website 
Futbolme team profile 
FCF team profile 

Football clubs in Catalonia
Association football clubs established in 2010
Divisiones Regionales de Fútbol clubs
2010 establishments in Spain